The Vision is a fictional character portrayed by Paul Bettany in the Marvel Cinematic Universe (MCU) media franchise, based on the Marvel Comics character of the same name. Vision is a vibranium-based male android (or "Synthezoid") created by Ultron to serve as his body. However, the body is stolen by the Avengers and brought to sentience by Tony Stark and Bruce Banner, who upload the core software of Stark's AI, J.A.R.V.I.S., into the body constructed by Ultron, with energy provided by Thor. Vision subsequently joins the Avengers, kills Ultron, and later develops a romantic relationship with his teammate, Wanda Maximoff. Most of Vision's powers including flight, matter phasing, and energy-based beam attacks, stem from the Mind Stone in his forehead, which also keeps him alive. Vision is killed by Thanos when he removes the Mind Stone to complete the Infinity Gauntlet in order to initiate the Blip. Years later, Vision's body is reactivated via Wanda's magic, albeit initially without his memories and with a different appearance. Additionally, Wanda recreates Vision when she magically forms a false reality in the town of Westview, New Jersey, but this version vanishes when she returns to reality.

, Vision has appeared in three films. He has a lead role in the television series WandaVision (2021), and  alternate versions from within the MCU multiverse appear in the animated series What If...? (2021).

Conception and characterization
A character named The Vision debuted in a short comic story in Marvel Mystery Comics #13 (Nov. 1940) as an alien law enforcement officer also known as Aarkus, continuing as a regular feature in that superhero anthology through issue #48 (Oct. 1943). In the late 1960s, editor Stan Lee and writer Roy Thomas decided to add a new team member to the superhero-team series The Avengers. Thomas wanted to bring back the Golden Age alien Vision but Lee was set on introducing an android member. Thomas ultimately compromised by using a new, android Vision. The second Vision first appeared in The Avengers #57 (Oct. 1968). Thomas wanted the character to be white as befitting his ghostly name, but printing limitations of the time would have rendered him colorless, with un-inked paper where his skin should be. He settled on red as he did not want Vision to be green like the Hulk or blue like the Atlanteans. The character has been compared with Spock from Star Trek, but Thomas said that he was barely aware of the TV series at the time. He acknowledged being influenced by the Adam Link character by Otto Binder, one of the first robots treated as a sympathetic character rather than as a mechanical tool.

In The Avengers #75 (April 1970), the Scarlet Witch is reintroduced to the team and soon becomes a love interest for the Vision. Thomas recounted, "I felt that a romance of some sort would help the character development in The Avengers, and the Vision was a prime candidate because he appeared only in that mag... as did Wanda, for that matter. So they became a pair, for just such practical considerations. It would also, I felt, add to the development I was doing on the Vision's attempting to become ‘human.’"

Characterization

Prior to the introduction of Vision in the MCU, Paul Bettany had voiced J.A.R.V.I.S., Tony Stark's A.I. companion in previous films. Bettany admitted that he had little idea of what the role was, even as he recorded it, simply doing it as a favor for Jon Favreau. He was cast again as the Vision, an android created by Ultron. Bettany stated that he was surprised when Whedon asked him if he wanted to be the Vision because once an actor has been cast as a particular character in the MCU, they usually are not cast as another. On what intrigued him about the Vision, Bettany said, "The thing that appealed to me is that this sort of nascent creature being born, being both omnipotent and totally naive, the sort of danger of that and complex nature of a thing being born that is that powerful and that created in a second and the choices he makes morally are really complex and interesting. They've really managed to maintain all of that". Bettany also stated that the Vision feels paternal and protective to a number of people in the film, particularly Wanda Maximoff, and has the ability to change his density. Bettany did wire work for the part. Whedon stated he wanted to include the Vision in a second Avengers film before he signed onto the first film. Vision's on-screen appearance was designed by Trent Claus and his team at Lola VFX, based on concepts by Ryan Meinerding. Bettany's make-up, which consisted of a mix of face paint and prosthetics, took two hours to apply with make-up artists Jeremy Woodhead and Nik Williams citing the correct hue of the Vision's skin as the hardest thing to figure out. Ultimately, however, the prosthetics and tracking dots were removed digitally and replaced with CG.

Discussing the development of the character in Captain America: Civil War, Bettany noted that because the Vision was only created in the previous film, Age of Ultron, "you see my character get born... He must be both omnipotent and yet totally naive at the same time. And experiencing the world in real time and his place in it. Is he going to be a force of good or a force of evil?" Bettany also said he was interested in exploring "what it means to be human and what love is" with the character, as "The only way one can guarantee one's loyalty is love." This is exhibited in the connection Vision begins to form with Wanda Maximoff, with Bettany commenting, "They both have these new burgeoning powers that they don't understand ... I think he's worried that they're both dangerous. So he feels this real connection with her." As the Vision has the ability to create a projected disguise, he chooses to dress similarly to Howard Stark's attache, Edwin Jarvis. One review notes that "Vision is an android who gained consciousness and an affinity for love all at the same time, and so the latter is of the utmost importance to him".

In WandaVision, Bettany portrays a new version of the character created by Wanda within her reality from the part of the Mind Stone that lives in her, who is the embodiment of her sadness, hope, and love. Given this, Bettany described this Vision as "decent and honorable". He was influenced by the performances of Dick Van Dyke and Hugh Laurie for this version. Bettany also plays the original character, referred to as "The Vision", who is reassembled and reactivated by S.W.O.R.D. (Sentient Weapon Observation and Response Division). That version has an all-white appearance similar to when the comic book character was resurrected with an all-white body and without his memories and emotions. Bettany differentiated the two versions by portraying The Vision as familiar and intimidating at the same time.

Fictional character biography

Creation and joining the Avengers

In 2015, J.A.R.V.I.S. is apparently destroyed by Ultron, but it is later revealed that he actually distributed his consciousness throughout the Internet, allowing his security protocols to delay Ultron's attempt to access Earth's nuclear weapon launch codes long enough for Tony Stark to work out what had happened. The Avengers capture a synthetic vibranium body created by Ultron for himself, powered by the Mind Stone, and bring it to Avengers Tower, where Stark and Bruce Banner upload J.A.R.V.I.S. as the core software for the body. After a brief fight with other Avengers, who disagree with this effort, Thor uses Mjolnir's lightning to power its completion, creating the Vision. Thor explains that the gem in his forehead is one of the six Infinity Stones, the most powerful objects in existence. Having gained consciousness, Vision sides with Stark, Banner, Thor, Steve Rogers, Clint Barton, Pietro, and Wanda Maximoff against Ultron as he wishes to protect life. He lifts and hands Thor Mjolnir, which has been enchanted so that only "worthy" individuals can lift it, convincing the Avengers that he can be trusted. In Sokovia, Vision fights scores of Ultron's sentries, rescues Maximoff from the collapsing city, and destroys Ultron himself.
 
Sometime after, Vision arrives at the Avengers Compound and joins the Avengers alongside Maximoff, Sam Wilson, and James Rhodes,  led by Rogers and Natasha Romanoff.

Sokovia Accords and the Avengers Civil War

In 2016, Vision phases into Maximoff's bedroom and tells her and Rogers that Stark and Thaddeus Ross have arrived at the Compound. He learns about the Sokovia Accords and agrees with Stark on it, understanding that the United Nations would have control over the Avengers, remarking that the group's existence invites challenge and conflict, which often results in catastrophe. Vision is tasked to watch Maximoff, after she is placed on house arrest at the Compound. He attempts to make her feel comfortable by cooking her paprikash and they start to form a romantic relationship. Later, Vision sees Barton trying to break Maximoff out on Rogers' behalf, but stops him. Maximoff interferes and telekinetically pushes Vision beneath the Compound. Unharmed, Vision flies to Germany to help stop Rogers' team. During the fight, he aims to disable Wilson with an energy beam, but accidentally shoots down and cripples Rhodes, as he was distracted while tending to Maximoff. Vision flies back to New York and visits Rhodes in the hospital, before going back to the Compound.

Infinity War and death

In 2018, Vision, now in a romantic relationship with Maximoff, visits her in Edinburgh. However, the Mind Stone begins alerting Vision to an unknown threat before they are ambushed by Corvus Glaive and Proxima Midnight, two of Thanos' children. Vision is badly wounded by Glaive's namesake, which limits his powers. Glaive and Midnight attempt to remove Vision's Mind Stone, but Maximoff is able to hold them off until the pair are rescued by Rogers, Wilson, and Romanoff and return to the Compound. Vision volunteers to kill himself in order to destroy the Stone, but the Avengers refuse and bring him to Wakanda, where Vision is examined by Shuri, who attempts to safely remove the Stone without killing him, with Maximoff standing vigil over the operation. When Midnight, Cull Obsidian, and the Outriders attack Wakanda, Maximoff intervenes in the battle, leaving Shuri defenseless to Glaive, who infiltrated the center. Vision fights Glaive, and is nearly defeated before being rescued by Rogers. Vision in turn saves Rogers, killing Glaive with his own weapon. Thanos arrives, and as the Avengers attempt to hold him off, Vision manages to convince Maximoff to destroy the Mind Stone, which she does, at the cost of his life. However, Thanos uses the Time Stone to reverse the action, allowing him to rip the Mind Stone out of Vision's head. Sometime after, Vision's body is taken into S.W.O.R.D.'s custody.

Wanda's Hex and resurrection

In 2023, S.W.O.R.D. runs experiments on Vision's corpse at their headquarters in Florida. Maximoff, desiring to give him a burial, learns he is being experimented on, but is told that he is government property and cannot be released to her.

She travels to Westview, New Jersey, and in her grief creates a false reality to her liking, later called the "Hex", also creating a Hex Vision. Within the Hex, she and Hex Vision are married, live in a suburban neighborhood, and he works for Computational Services Inc. After Wanda becomes pregnant with twins, Hex Vision momentarily grows suspicious of their surroundings. Nonetheless, Hex Vision joins the neighborhood watch and Wanda gives birth to Billy and Tommy. When the twins grow up rapidly, he continues to question his and Wanda's life in Westview and uses his powers to learn that one of his co-workers is under mind control. He investigates further, and on the edge of town he finds residents frozen in place, including his neighbor Agnes. He discovers a hexagonal barrier and tries to leave, but begins to disintegrate before he can reach the nearby S.W.O.R.D. outpost while telling the S.W.O.R.D. agents and Darcy Lewis that the people inside need help. Maximoff expands the Hex, restoring Vision. After waking up, he finds Lewis in Westview and awakens her from her trance. While heading home with her to confront Maximoff, Lewis tells him about his past life and death.

Acting S.W.O.R.D. director Tyler Hayward uses Maximoff's powers to reactivate Vision, now with a white body and his memories erased, and deploys him into Westview. He attacks Maximoff, but Hex Vision engages in a fight with him, during which they discuss the paradox of the Ship of Theseus. Vision permits Hex Vision to restore Vision's memories and realizes he is an Avenger. He then flies away to process this information.

Hex Vision learns that he is a memory of Maximoff that was created through her powers and the Mind Stone, and says his final goodbyes before he fades from existence when the Hex is removed.

Alternate versions 

Several alternate universe versions of Vision appear in the animated series What If...?, with Bettany reprising his role while Ross Marquand voices a version of Ultron in Vision's body.

Zombie outbreak 

In an alternate 2018, a quantum virus is unleashed and infects several humans, turning them into zombies. The unaffected Vision keeps the zombified Maximoff contained at Camp Lehigh, where he experiments with the Mind Stone to find a cure and manages to cure Scott Lang and preserve his severed head in a jar. However, Vision is unable to cure Wanda, leading him to lure in individuals, such as T'Challa, and feed them to her. Eventually, after the surviving Avengers and their allies arrive at the base, Vision hands over the Mind Stone to Bruce Banner, killing himself in the process.

Ultron's vessel 

In an alternate 2015, Ultron successfully transfers his consciousness into Vision's body and goes on to kill most of the Avengers and eliminate all life in the universe after obtaining the other five Infinity Stones from Thanos. After learning about the Watcher and the existence of other realities, Ultron travels to the Watcher's observatory, from where he gains access to every timeline in the multiverse, intending to destroy each of them. However, he is foiled by the Watcher and the Guardians of the Multiverse, who upload Arnim Zola's mind into his body, allowing Zola to delete his consciousness. Although Zola, now controlling Vision's body, tries to fight Erik "Killmonger" Stevens for control over the Infinity Stones, they are both frozen in a pocket dimension by the Watcher and Doctor Strange Supreme, with the latter agreeing to guard them for the rest of eternity.

Appearance and special effects
A review of the character for The Hollywood Reporter notes: "The comic book Vision employs a garish green-and-yellow costume, matched with a bright red face — a color scheme that may be a little over-the-top for the more subtly-hued Marvel Cinematic Universe — but even so, the mixture of purple, blue and grey is an unexpected, and unexpectedly bold, choice for Paul Bettany's character".

In terms of fashion while maintaining a civilian appearance, Vision attempts to emulate classic human style, including wearing an ascot tie.

When Vision is reactivated by S.W.O.R.D., his entire body is white and he has light blue eyes.

Reception

Critical response 
Following the release of WandaVision, Jen Chaney of Vulture stated, "Olsen and Bettany's characters were often treated like benchwarmers on an all-star team in the Avengers movies. Here, they really shine." The review further found that Bettany "slides easily into the role of the devoted, kinda square, goofball husband," and praised his physical comedy skills. Saim Cheeda of CBR.com praised Bettany's performance across the MCU, especially in WandaVision, writing, "Paul Bettany has proved in WandaVision that he is the absolute perfect choice for playing Vision, nailing many of his characteristics." Tyler Pisapia of Looper inducted Bettany's portrayal of Vision through the MCU among his best performances overall, stating, "From his heroics — and ultimate death — in the Avengers franchise to his subsequent revival in WandaVision, Bettany's Vision has added a deeply soulful component to the MCU through his portrayal of a being whose synthetic structure doesn't deprive him of his essential humanity." TVLine named Bettany "Performer of the Week" for the week of January 16, 2021.

Accolades

Notes

References

External links
 Vision on the Marvel Cinematic Universe Wiki
 The Vision on the Marvel Cinematic Universe Wiki
 
 Vision on Marvel.com

Androids in television
Avengers (film series)
Fictional androids
Fictional characters who can turn intangible
Fictional characters with density control abilities
Fictional characters with energy-manipulation abilities
Fictional people from the 21st-century
Fictional technopaths
Film characters introduced in 2015
Marvel Cinematic Universe characters
Marvel Comics characters who can move at superhuman speeds
Marvel Comics characters with superhuman strength
Marvel Comics robots
Robot superheroes
WandaVision